The School of Journalism & Mass Communication (UWSJMC) (or "J-School") is the journalism school of the University of Wisconsin–Madison.  Located in Vilas Communication Hall, the School offers two undergraduate programs (BA Journalism and BS Journalism, both with reporting and strategic communication tracks), two Master of Arts programs in Journalism (Research and Professional), and a doctoral program (PhD Mass Communications) jointly administered with the Department of Life Sciences Communication.

The School is a pioneer in journalism education and a consistently top-ranked communication institution.  It is one of the first to grant a doctoral degree in mass communication, and its PhD program has the reputation for producing leading scholars in the field, including Guido Stempel, Donald Shaw, Richard Perloff, Pamela Shoemaker, and Dietram Scheufele.

At present, the School offers more than 50 courses to nearly 500 undergraduate majors and about 100 graduate students. Administratively, it is under the College of Letters and Science. The School houses the world-renowned Mass Communication Research Center, as well as the Center for Journalism Ethics and the Wisconsin Center for Investigative Journalism.

History

Journalism 
Journalism education at the University of Wisconsin began in 1904 with a single professor, Willard Grosvenor Bleyer, a single course, Law and The Press, and 25 students. The original focus of the program was news-editorial journalism. Over the next few years, new courses were developed for reporting, writing, editing and advanced concepts. The university established journalism as a department in 1912, and reformulated it as the School of Journalism in 1927.

The school was one of the pioneers of emphasizing professional experience beyond the classroom through formative internships in the for-profit, government and nonprofit sectors. In the 1930s and 1940s, the school’s second director, Grant Milnor Hyde, placed students in the city rooms of local newspapers for live assignments and began awarding class credit for such work.

Radio-television news and advertising 
The School was among the first to introduce education in electronic editing and the offset press. Radio news started in the School before World War II, and by 1970 a radio-television news sequence was established.

The first sequence in advertising was developed in association with courses offered by the School of Business. By the early 1950s it encompassed creative and account management areas. Public relations developed under Professor Scott M. Cutlip, from a single lecture course in the 1940s to an established sequence by 1970.

But neither of these new tracks worked in isolation from the School's training in journalism.

Mass communication 
To reflect the growing intellectual and professional diversity, the School adopted a broader term to better reflect the wide range of its teaching, research and service: "mass communication.” In 1970, it was officially rebranded as the School of Journalism and Mass Communication.  The School moved to its first permanent, dedicated home in 1972, with the opening of Vilas Communication Hall.

Graduate program 
Ralph O. Nafziger’s arrival as director in 1949 began an insistence on new rigor in research. He sought and obtained the establishment of a PhD in Mass Communication. Among the first such PhD programs in the nation, it granted its first degree in 1953. By 1973, the School graduated more PhDs in mass communication than any other school.

Academic programs

Undergraduate

Bachelor's degrees 
The School grants two degrees for undergraduate students: Journalism Bachelor of Arts (JBA) and Journalism Bachelor of Science (JBS). Students may choose either reporting or strategic communications as their major track. Those who choose to double-track would take courses sequentially.

The reporting concentration focuses on the skills needed to become a journalist across media platforms, and is not split into tracks focused on specific topics or media. On the other hand, the strategic communication concentration allows students to focus on areas such as creative media messaging, strategic public relations, and account and media planning.

Certificate 
Along with five other departments, the School offers the interdisciplinary Digital Studies Certificate program. The program is open to all undergraduates at UW-Madison and offers 50 courses from the School Journalism & Mass Communication, as well as the departments of Art, Communication Arts, Life Sciences Communication, English, and the Information School.

Graduate 
The School grants two master's degrees and a doctoral degree.  The Research MA focuses on developing tools in mass communication research and typically leads to enrollment in a doctoral program, while the Professional M.A. typically leads to careers in news and information production.

The PhD in Mass Communications program is jointly administered with the Department of Life Sciences Communication. This is different from the PhD in Communication Arts offered by the Department of Communication Arts.  The Mass Communications doctoral program covers internationally recognized areas of research and teaching excellence, such as civic and political communication, health and environmental communications, law and ethics of media, and history of media institutions, among others.

Reputation and Rankings 
The annual QS World University Rankings consistently ranked UW-Madison as a top-10 institution for communication and media studies from 2013 to 2018, ranking 1st in 2014.  It slipped out of the top 10 in 2019 by ranking 12th.

In ShanghaiRanking's Global Ranking of Academic Subjects (Communication), UW-Madison ranked 5th in 2017, 7th in 2018, and 8th in 2019⁠ in terms of publication score.

According to the 2017 Center for World University Rankings, UW-Madison ranked 4th in subject rankings for communication.

In the 2010 Assessment of Research Doctorate Programs by the US National Research Council, the School's doctoral program received high marks compared to more than 80 PhD communication programs within the country.  In the 2010 assessment, programs were given a range of high and low ranks for each indicator.  As reported by NRC, the School received the following high-low ranks:

 Ranked 1-6 in terms of S-Rank, wherein a doctoral program is ranked highly if it is strong in the criteria that scholars say are most important;
 Ranked 1-6 in terms of Research, derived from faculty publications, citation rates, grants, and awards.

In a study of prestige of communication doctoral programs based on faculty hiring patterns, the UW-Madison ranked first in terms of "placement centrality."
In a national survey, 221 faculty members and 49 chairs of communication departments were asked to name the top 3 US communication programs, and UW-Madison's program was ranked first.

Notable alumni 
See also List of University of Wisconsin–Madison people.

 Anthony Shadid, two-time Pulitzer Prize-winning journalist.
 Louis P. Lochner, Pulitzer Prize-winning journalist.
 Neal Ulevich, Pulitzer Prize-winning photographer.
 Deborah Blum, Pulitzer Prize-winning journalist.
 Paul Ingrassia, Pulitzer Prize-winning journalist.

References

School of Journalism and Mass Communication
Journalism schools in the United States
1912 establishments in Wisconsin